A Girl Danced Into His Life is a 1964 Hungarian film directed by Tamás Banovich. It was entered into the 1965 Cannes Film Festival where it won a Technical Prize.

Cast
 Adél Orosz - A lány
 Levente Sipeki - A fiú
 György Bárdy - Black Man
 Irma Vass - (as Vas Irma)
 Tamás Major - Képmutogató
 Hilda Gobbi - A Képmutogató felesége
 Zsolt Galántai - A Képmutogató fia

References

External links

1964 films
Hungarian musical films
1960s Hungarian-language films